Eufeeds.eu is the biggest RSS aggregator that provides direct RSS news from more than 1000 European newspapers, press agencies and magazines. 

It is updated every 20 minutes and it covers 27 European Union countries with the most popular national, regional and local newspapers (there is also a special page dedicated to news about Europe).  

Eufeeds.eu was founded in 2007 by the European Journalism Centre of Maastricht.

References 

 Afeedisborn.com, a weblog about rss, webfeeds, and information overload. "Eufeeds is newsfeeds every 20 minutes" 
 Journalism.co.uk, "the essential site for journalists" "European Journalism Centre aggregation project tops 500 mark"

External links 
Eufeeds (Archived)
European Journalism Centre
Advanced Alchemy Holdings Limited

News aggregators